Cawdor is a village of Wollondilly Shire, in the state of New South Wales, Australia. Part of the locality of Cawdor lies within Camden Council.

Population
At the 2021 census, the population of Cawdor was 430. 84.4% were born in Australia and 91.4% spoke only English at home. The most common religious affiliations were Catholic 39.1% and Anglican 22.8%.

References

External links
  [CC-By-SA]

Towns in New South Wales
Towns in the Macarthur (New South Wales)
Wollondilly Shire
Camden Council (New South Wales)